North Whittier is an unincorporated community in Los Angeles County in the U.S. state of California. The population was 4,351 according to the 2000 census.

North Whittier is home to Rio Hondo College and Rose Hills Memorial Park, which claims to be the largest cemetery in North America.

Geography
North Whittier has a total area of 5.46 square miles. North Whittier is located at coordinates  (34.0112391, -118.026387).

Demographics

2000
There were 4,351 people living in North Whittier, according to the US Census. The population density was 797 inhabitants per square mile. The racial makeup of the area was 57.4% Latino, 24.1% White, 15.6% Asian, 0.8% African American, and 2.1% from other races. The average household size was 3.0. The age distribution was 15.4% 10 and under, 10.8% from 11 to 18, 19.5% from 19 to 34, 25.0% from 35 to 49, 19.3% from 50 to 64, and 10.0% 65 or older. The median age was 37 years. The median household income was $93,841. (in 2008 dollars)

Government and infrastructure

Education
The school districts that serve North Whittier include Whittier City Elementary School District and Whittier Union High School District.

References

Unincorporated communities in Los Angeles County, California